The Suiattle River is a river in the U.S. state of Washington.

Course
The Suiattle River originates from the Suiattle Glacier on the east slopes of Glacier Peak in the Cascade Range. It flows generally northwest to join the Sauk River north of Darrington. The Sauk River in turn joins the Skagit River, which empties into Skagit Bay, part of Puget Sound. It is a National Wild and Scenic River.

Tributaries
The Suiattle's largest tributaries include Chocolate Creek, entering the river's upper reaches, Dusty Creek, Sulpher Creek and Downey Creek. Image Lake is in the river's drainage basin.

See also
 List of rivers of Washington

References

External links

Rivers of Washington (state)
North Cascades of Washington (state)
Rivers of Skagit County, Washington
Rivers of Snohomish County, Washington
Wild and Scenic Rivers of the United States